Lala Şahin Pasha, 1330 – 1388(?), was an Ottoman commander and first Beylerbey of Rumelia. He was the teacher (lala) of Sultan Murad I, and when Murad succeeded the throne, Şahin led the Ottoman campaign of Thrace. In 1360, he took Didymoticho, and in 1362, Adrianople, which afterwards served as the Ottoman seat of throne as Edirne. In 1364, conquered Boruj and Plovdiv in Bulgaria. He was one of commanders in Battle of Maritsa (1371). From 1383 to 1385 he ruled as the Ottoman governor in Sofia. He was defeated by Prince Lazar of Serbia at the Battle of Pločnik (1385–86). On 27 August 1388 he was defeated by an alliance of Bosnian princes at the Battle of Bileća. Lala Shahin probably died in 1389 in Kazanlak, Bulgaria has an old mausoleum /turbe/ in park "Tulbeto", near the famous Thracian Tomb of Kazanlak. Later the remains of Lala Shahin was removed from Kazanlak tomb to another one in his homeland, Mustafakemalpaşa district in the province of Bursa, Turkey.

References 

Pashas
Military personnel of the Ottoman Empire
14th-century people from the Ottoman Empire
Lalas (title)
Devshirme
Ottoman governors of Rumelia
People of the Bulgarian–Ottoman wars